Jose L. Jimenez may refer to:

 José Jiménez Negrón (José Luis Jiménez Negrón, born 1954), Puerto Rican politician
 Jose L. Jimenez (chemist), Spanish–American chemist